Benjamin White House may refer to:

Benjamin White House (Milton, Delaware), listed on the National Register of Historic Places in Sussex County, Delaware
Benjamin White House (Brookline, Massachusetts), listed on the National Register of Historic Places in Norfolk County, Massachusetts